Belgrave is an area, suburb, electoral ward and administrative division of the city of Leicester, England. Belgrave is the location of and known for the National Space Centre, Space Park Leicester, the Golden Mile and Belgrave Hall.

The old Belgrave Village, containing the Belgrave Conservation Area, including Belgrave Hall, St Peter's Church and The Talbot Inn is to the west of Loughborough Road and to the east of the River Soar.

Geography

Belgrave is bounded by the wards and areas of the suburb of Rushey Mead and the village of Birstall to the north, Spinney Hills, North Evington and Northfields to the east on the other side of the Midland Main Line, St Matthew's and Leicester City Centre to the south and Beaumont Leys and Stocking Farm to the west. It is located just north of the centre of Leicester, in the eastern part of the city. The old village part of Belgrave is close to the Leicestershire county border and the Borough of Charnwood at the beginning of the Leicester Urban Area in that direction which is located on the other side of Red Hill Circle. Belgrave therefore stretches from and adjoins the city centre and the county.

Etymology
The settlement was named in the Domesday Book as Merdegrave (from Old English mearð 'marten' + grāf 'grove'). However, after the Norman Conquest the merde, which means excrement in French, was changed to bel.

History
Belgrave was originally one of Leicestershire’s ancient villages, the first mention of which, under its original Saxon name of Merdegrave (which in old English means Martins grove) appears in Domesday Book of 1086 where it is listed amongst the lands given to Hugh de Grandmesnil. Grandmesnil had fought at the side of William the Conqueror at Hastings and was his chief cavalry commander. As a reward for his services he was granted several manors/lands of which this was one. by the King. The land consisted of a mill,  of meadow and land for six ploughs. For centuries afterwards Belgrave continued as a small agricultural village.

During the Middle Ages Belgrave became one of Leicestershire’s wealthier livings. In the thirteenth century its value rocketed. In 1217 it was valued at 16 marks, at 30 in 1254 and at 60 in 1291.

Belgrave was one of the communities in Leicestershire that experienced the shock of military confrontation because of its situation on the busy London to Derby road which cut right through the heart of the village unlike neighbouring Birstall and Wanlip which it bypassed by some hundreds of yards.

When the English Civil War burst violently into Belgrave, records indicate that there were a number of skirmishes between the opposing forces around the Thurcaston Road bridge and inside St Peter's Church. There is damage to the Tudor Memorial to Ambrose de Belgrave which suggests that it may have been used for target practice.

With large 19th century terraced developments along the A607 (Belgrave Road and Melton Road), this area now has a large, vibrant Asian community featuring the "Golden Mile". The Asian community based in and around Belgrave and Melton Road have been residents since the early 1970s.

The Belgrave Hall area is a conservation area.

Belgrave is home to Belgrave Hall & Gardens. Belgrave Hall, built between 1709 and 1713 is a Grade II* listed building in a plain classical style. The Hall is in the midst of two acres of serene walled gardens that are open to the public during special events. It has changed hands many times, but the owners have always played a major role in the economic, social and charitable life of the community.

St Peter's Church is the oldest building in the local conservation area, parts of which date from the twelfth century. Archaeologists believe there may be an earlier Saxon church beneath the present structure.

The Talbot Inn has origins in the 14th century, when it was a popular stop providing bed and board to those who travelled through Leicester along Loughborough Road.

As can be seen by some of the houses along Loughborough Road there were some very wealthy residents, including the Chief constable of Leicester at one point.

As the wealth of the area grew so did the population and by the late 19th century many more houses were being built.

As Belgrave grew so did the town of Leicester and at such a rate that by 1891 Belgrave was subsumed into the Corporation of Leicester.

The area continued to expand with some of the earlier 19th century houses being replaced by 1930s semis. By the 1960s and 1970s large parts of Belgrave were cleared of the old Victorian terraced houses including Mellor School, the Baptist Church on Loughborough Road and Claremont Street Methodist Church, and were replaced with more modern structures.

In 1975 the old area of the village was declared a Conservation area, and it is this area that represents the nucleus of the ancient village.

Business and commerce
Belgrave based British United Shoe Machinery, formed around the turn of the 20th century as a subsidiary of United Shoe Machinery Company of the United States, became part of a group which for most of the 20th century was the world's largest manufacturer of footwear machinery and materials, exporting shoe machinery to more than 50 countries. In the 1960s and 1970s, it was Leicester's biggest employer employing more than 4,500 locally and 9,500 worldwide. Most of the workforce was recruited via an apprentice scheme which trained a large proportion of Leicester's engineers. The company had "a respected reputation for technical innovation and excellence", between 1898 and 1960, it developed and marketed nearly 800 new and improved shoe machines and patented more than 9,000 inventions, at one time employing 5% of the UK's patent agents.

Parker Plant in Belgrave opened in 1911 inside a single railway arch. The business relocated to an 18-acre site in 1926. In the 1950s, 60s and 70s they were employing over 1,400 people to meet demand. In 1969, 1978 and in 1994 the business won the prestigious Queen's Award for Enterprise. In 2006 Universal Conveyors was acquired and in 2007 Phoenix Parker Holdings Ltd was formed. In 2014 Phoenix Transworld, Cartem & Universal Conveyors marketed under the Parker brand.

Bostik is in Belgrave as well as the Fred Perry clothing label having been in Belgrave.

Demographics
The area, since the 1970s, has had a large Asian population and is now predominately Asian.

According to the 2001 UK census, 104 Pacific Island born people were residing in Belgrave, with many more being of Pacific Islander descent. This is the largest number for any location in the UK.

As of the 2011 census

The population of Belgrave was 11,558 and is made up of approximately 51% females and 49% males.

The average age of people in Belgrave is 36, while the median age is lower at 34.

43.0% of people living in Belgrave were born in England. Other top answers for country of birth were 28.4% India, 5.6% Kenya, 3.2% Sri Lanka, 1.6% Africa not otherwise specified, 0.8% Pakistan, 0.6% Zimbabwe, 0.4% Somalia, 0.3% Bangladesh, 0.2% Scotland.

46.7% of people living in Belgrave speak English as their main language. The other top languages spoken are 35.8% Gujarati, 4.3% Punjabi, 3.3% Tamil, 1.3% Portuguese, 0.9% South Asian Language, 0.9% Polish, 0.9% Hindi, 0.9% Urdu, 0.6% Somali.

The religious make up of Belgrave is 54.6% Hindu, 14.3% Christian, 14.1% Muslim, 6.4% No religion, 5.5% Sikh, 0.3% Buddhist. 443 people did not state a religion. Four people identified as Jedi knights.

48.1% of people are married, 4.0% cohabit with a member of the opposite sex, 0.5% live with a partner of the same sex, 28.9% are single and have never married or been in a registered same sex partnership, 7.5% are separated or divorced. There are 487 widowed people living in Belgrave.

The top occupations listed by people in Belgrave are Elementary at 20.6%, Process, plant and machine operatives at 18.7%, Elementary administration and service at 14.3%, Sales and customer service at 13.1%, Sales at 10.7%, Sales Assistants and Retail Cashiers at 9.8%, Administrative and secretarial at 9.6%, Caring, leisure and other service at 9.2% and Process Operatives at 8.5%.

Education

Schools in the area
Primary schools:
Belgrave St Peter's Church of England Primary,
Mellor Community Primary,
Catherine Infants and Catherine Juniors,
St Patrick's Catholic Primary,
Abbey Primary and Rushey Mead Primary.

Secondary schools:

Rushey Mead Academy, which is the best state-funded secondary school in Leicester and Leicestershire and Soar Valley College.

College:

Leicester College – Abbey Park Campus.

Places of interest
Belgrave Hall – An-18th century Hall owned at one point by the MP and Businessman John Ellis. It is known for its paranormal happenings and has been subject to world media attention. It was a museum but is now an events venue and is occasionally used for public events with the gardens opening periodically throughout the year. 
The Belgrave Conservation Area – Includes Belgrave Hall, St Peter's Church and The Talbot Inn.
The Golden Mile – Known for the many Indian shops along it, including gold jewellery, food and saree shops. This road is at the centre of annual Diwali celebrations in the city, having rows of lights that are switched on in front of tens of thousands of visitors each year.
The National Space Centre – museum and educational resource covering the fields of space science and astronomy, containing the United Kingdom's largest planetarium.
Space Park Leicester – a pioneering £100 million research, innovation and teaching hub for space-related high-tech companies and researchers focussing primarily on research, development and applications of space.
Abbey Pumping Station – a science and technology museum.
Abbey Park – Leicester’s premier park in which the River Soar runs through.
The Peepul Centre – a multi-use facility.
Leicester Outdoor Pursuits Centre – a sports facility aside the River Soar.

Scenery
The River Soar runs along the west of Belgrave.

Gallery

Area
The electoral ward of Rushey Mead contains a part of Belgrave meaning that despite the actual geographical location that specific area may also be classed as being in Rushey Mead by virtue of the electoral ward mapping.

Transport

Major roads
Belgrave is located on, at the start of and at the south end of the A607 and is also on the A6 and the A563.

Bus
First Leicester service 4 and 21 serve Belgrave on the A607 and Catherine Street respectively.

First Leicester services 25 and 26 travel along Belgrave Gate with service 25 going through the Old Village and service 26 going by Abbey Park and by the Old Village.

Arriva Midlands services 5, 5A and 6 all serve the A607 whilst Arriva Midlands service 127 serves Loughborough Road, travelling by the Old Village.

All bus services operate along or by the Golden Mile from and into Leicester City Centre.

The nearest bus stations, both in Leicester City Centre are the Haymarket and St Margaret's.

Train
The nearest train station is Leicester railway station.

The Midland Main Line runs along at the east of Belgrave.

Leicester Belgrave Road railway station and Belgrave and Birstall railway station are both now closed.

Airport
The nearest airport is East Midlands Airport, in Leicestershire and 19.2 miles away from Belgrave.

Politics
Belgrave is located within the Leicester East parliament constituency, a seat held by the Labour Party consistently since 1987 albeit with a significantly reduced majority in the 2019 United Kingdom general election, though reflecting a widespread national trend for the Labour Party in that particular election.

The Belgrave electoral ward is currently represented on Leicester City Council by Labour Councillors Padmini Chamund, Nita Solanki and Mahendra Mohanbhai Valand.

The electoral ward of Rushey Mead includes parts of Belgrave.

Former Councillors for Belgrave include Archibald Berridge and Ramnik Kavia, both of whom served as Lord Mayors of Leicester, Colin Hall, the city's Lord Mayor from 2010 to 2011 and a resident of the area since 1968 and Manjula Sood, Britain's first Asian woman Lord Mayor.

Belgrave was represented within the East Midlands parliamentary constituency in the European Parliament.

Council election results

Belgrave 2019

Belgrave 2015

Sport
Belgrave Road Cycle and Cricket Ground in Belgrave was a sports ground which hosted early matches of Leicester Fosse, who re-formed as Leicester City and Leicester Tigers. The ground was opened on 5 May 1880 by Edwyn Sherard Burnaby, the MP for Leicestershire North as a 10-acre site with mile long running and cycling tracks, cricket and football pitches and hosted Leicester Tigers first official game against Moseley on 23 October of that year. The Tigers moved from Belgrave in January 1881 before moving back for the 1882/83 season. Leicester Fosse, a forerunner of Leicester City played soccer at the ground for the 1887/88 season, their fourth, however only lasted one season before their outbidding for use of the ground by Leicester Tigers. In June 1881 it also hosted Leicestershire County Cricket Club against an All England XI. It opened in 1880 and closed in 1901 when houses, shops and part of the British United Shoe Machinery were built on the site.

Notable people
John Ellis - MP for Leicester, businessman, Chairman of Midland Railway, noted liberal reformer and Quaker and a former owner and resident, along with his family of Belgrave Hall.
Jennie Fletcher – British competitive swimmer, Olympic gold medallist and former world record holder – born in Belgrave.
Tony Sibson – Professional boxer and former European and Commonwealth middleweight champion – lived in and went to school in Belgrave.
David Weston – artist and author – born in Belgrave.
Tom Sidwell – cricketer – born in Belgrave.
George Walton – cricketer – born and died in Belgrave.

Bibliography

References

External links

Visit Leicester - Belgrave
Curve Theatre – Fashioning a City – Belgrave
 Belgrave's first saree shop from BBC Radio Leicester
 

Areas of Leicester